Nantes Rugby XIII are a French Rugby league club based in Nantes, Loire-Atlantique in the Pays de la Loire region. The club play in the Aquitaine regional League of the French National Division 2.

History 

Founded in 1936 as Bretagne Nantes XIII they were one of the earliest Rugby League clubs in France. The club's only finals appearance arrived in season 1963/64 in the old 2nd Division now called National Division 1 when they lost to SM Pia XIII. The club runs junior and ladies teams down to u7s.

References

External links 

 Website

1936 establishments in France
French rugby league teams
Rugby clubs established in 1936